Budak Nafsu (literally Slave to Lust, also known as Fatima) is a 1983 Indonesian film directed by Sjumandjaja and adapted from the 1981 novel Fatima by Titie Said. Starring Jenny Rachman and El Manik, it follows a mother who is forced to serve as a comfort woman for Japanese men stationed in British Malaya in an effort to save her daughter. The film was a commercial success, although critics have emphasised its sexual aspects.

Plot
Fatima (Jenny Rachman) offers herself to be brought away by Japanese occupation forces to save her of her daughter, thus resigning herself to the fate of a comfort woman. She is one of hundreds of women sent from the Dutch East Indies (now Indonesia) to Japanese-occupied British Malaya and forced to work in a brothel. There she meets Takashi (El Manik), a kindly Japanese commander who falls in love with her. Fatima moves in with him, which protects her from the other men.

Meanwhile, Fatima works with the local rebels and helps them capture the military base. The prisoners are freed. Takashi, meanwhile, discovers Fatima's betrayal and releases her before committing suicide. Although she is able to escape the base, Fatima is not allowed to join the rebels, having caught syphilis while at the brothel. As she makes her way back to the Indies, which has since proclaimed its independence, Fatima's ship is captured by Dutch soldiers from the Netherlands Indies Civil Administration (NICA).

Fatima is forced to work in a NICA brothel for the remainder of the Indonesian National Revolution, although she remains combative. After the revolution, Fatima is released into poverty and over the years finds that even Indonesians misuse her. She falls ill and is brought to a hospital, where she is treated by the daughter she had left years earlier, now a doctor. The aged Fatima soon leaves the hospital and wanders about, looking at the neon signs advertising Japanese products.

Production
Budak Nafsu was directed by Sjumandjaja. He had been raised in Batavia (modern day Jakarta) during the Japanese occupation, and when the Japanese were expanding the Kemayoran Airport, he witnessed several forced labourers being beaten to death. He adapted Budak Nafsu from the novel Fatima (1981) by Titie Said; he had initially planned on keeping the original title, and the film has also been released as Fatima.

The film starred Jenny Rachman in the leading female role of Fatima and El Manik as Takadeshi. More minor roles were taken by Sofia WD, Roy Marten, and Maruli Sitompul. Many of these actors had previous experience with the director. Sjumandjaja also had a cameo. According to El Manik, on one occasion the actor expressed concern that a Japanese commander would be unable to speak Indonesian fluently, as Sjumandjaja's screenplay called for, and that there should be Japanese-language dialogue. Sjumandjaja told him to write the dialogue himself if he wanted.

The crew included Norman Benny as editor, Soetomo Gandasubrata as cinematographer, and Djufri Tanissan as artistic director; music was provided by Idris Sardi. Budak Nafsu was the first film produced by Raam Lalchand Pridhani (credited as Ram Soraya) and his Soraya Intercine Film.

Themes
In his 1991 typology of Indonesian cinema, the American visual anthropologist Karl G. Heider placed Budak Nafsu in a "Japanese period" genre, characterised by violence in excess of works showing the colonial period and the use of female nudity "only as part of the violence, never as a consequence of love". He also outlined a standard plot for these works, one reflected in Budak Nafsu. Other examples of the genre include Kadarwati, Kamp Tawanan Wanita (both 1983), and Lebak Membara (1982).

Release and reception
Budak Nafsu was released in 1983 and was a commercial success. Heider described Budak Nafsu as "little more than a sex exploitation vehicle", and several other critical reviews have emphasised the vulgarity of the film.

A 35 mm copy of Budak Nafsu is available at Sinematek Indonesia.

Awards
Budak Nafsu was nominated for nine Citra Awards at the 1984 Indonesian Film Festival, winning four.

Footnotes

Works cited

External links

Films directed by Sjumandjaja
Films based on Indonesian novels
1983 drama films
1983 films
Indonesian drama films